Doberman Infinity Stylized as DOBERMAN INFINITY (also known as D.I) is a Japanese hip-hop group managed by LDH Japan and signed to the record label LDH Music.

History

Doberman Inc: 2000-2014 
In 2000, three members of "West Head", KUBO-C, GS, and P-CHO, formed "Doberman Inc" with Tomogen and MAB through track maker Bachlogic.  In 2002, the group started as an independent group with the album "Dobermann".

In 2004, the group signed to the major label Victor Entertainment, and made their major debut with the mini-album "Conversation Piece".  In 2006, MAB withdrew, the group continued their activities with four members.

In 2008, the group became affiliated with LDH and started being managed by the company.  On 17 October 2013, Tomogen left the  group.

Doberman Infinity: 2014-Present 
On 17 June 2014, it was announced that Kazuki who was a finalist in "Vocal Battle Audition 4" would be joining the group which would be renamed to "Doberman Infinity". A week later, on 24 June, the group announced the addition of Sway and the comeback of the group. The group also moved label to Toy's Factory.

In 2017, the group moved label to LDH's own record label LDH Music.

Members

Present members

Past members

Discography

Albums

Studio albums

Mini-albums

Compilation albums

Singles

As lead artists

As featured artists

Digital Singles

Participating works

Video albums

Live

Tours

Concerts

Tie-up

Filmography

Radio

Music videos

Producing

Artists 

 Ballistik Boyz from Exile Tribe (Co-produced with Exile Hiro)

Photobook

Doberman Inc's Discography

Albums

Studio albums

Mini-albums

Best albums

Singles

Digital Singles

Notes

References

External links 
DOBERMAN INFINITY
We are D.I -DOBERMAN INFINITY OFFICIAL FAN CLUB-
DOBERMAN INFINITY Official Blog - Ameba Blog

Twitter

Old links
DOBERMAN INFINITY | TOY'S FACTORY
DOBERMAN INFINITY Official Blog  "INFINITY" (May 2008- November 2014)

2014 establishments in Japan
Japanese boy bands
Japanese hip hop groups
Musical groups established in 2014
LDH (company) artists